Lars Søndergaard (born 5 April 1959) is a Danish professional football manager and former player who works as manager of the Denmark women's national team.

On 18 December 2017, it was announced by the Danish Football Association (DBU) that Lars Søndergaard was the new manager for the Denmark women's national team. He signed a contract which would last until the end of UEFA Women's Euro 2021. On 10 October 2020, DBU announced that Søndergaard had signed a new contract which would last until a potential qualification for the 2023 FIFA Women's World Cup.

References

1959 births
Living people
Sportspeople from Aalborg
Danish men's footballers
AaB Fodbold players
Danish football managers
AaB Fodbold managers
FC Red Bull Salzburg managers
FK Austria Wien managers
Grazer AK managers
Viborg FF managers
SønderjyskE Fodbold managers
Denmark women's national football team managers
Association footballers not categorized by position
Danish Superliga managers
FC Wacker Innsbruck (2002) managers
Austrian Football Bundesliga managers
Danish expatriate football managers
Danish expatriate sportspeople in Austria
Expatriate football managers in Austria
UEFA Women's Euro 2022 managers